Andrés Ibáñez Province is one of the fifteen provinces of the Bolivian Santa Cruz Department, situated in the western part of the department. Its capital is Santa Cruz de la Sierra which is also the capital of the department.

The province was created on December 6, 1944, during the presidency of Gualberto Villarroel López.

Location 
Andrés Ibáñez Province is located between 17° 30' and 18° 15' South and between 62° 48' and 63° 40' West. It extends over 110 km from west to east, and 90 km from north to south. 

The province is situated in the Bolivian lowlands and borders Ignacio Warnes Province and Sara Province in the north, Ichilo Province in the northwest, Florida Province in the southwest, Cordillera Province in the southeast, and Chiquitos Province in the east.

Climate 

Andrés Ibáñez Province is situated in an area of a semihumid tropical climate. It is characterized by a very short dry season in the months of July and August and sufficient precipitation during the rest of the year, reaching a maximum in January.

The monthly average temperatures are a tropical 20 to 26°C, with the lowest temperatures in the dry season when nights are slightly colder because the cloud cover is broken. The yearly average temperature is 23.9°C.

Division 
Andrés Ibáñez Province comprises five municipalities which are further subdivided into cantons.

Population 
The population of Andrés Ibáñez Province has increased by circa 130% over the recent two decades:
1992: 784,678 inhabitants (census)
2001: 1,260,549 inhabitants (census)
2005: 1,526,187 inhabitants (est.)
2010: 1,841,282 inhabitants (est.)

40.1% of the population are younger than 15 years old. (1992)

99.0% of the population speak Spanish, 12.5% speak Quechua, 3.4% Aymara, and 0.8 speak Guaraní. (1992)

6.7% of the employed population work in agriculture, 1.0% in mining, 14.1% in the industrial sector, and 78.2% in general services (2001).

15.7% of the population have no access to electricity, 22.2% have no sanitary facilities. (1992)

86.1% of the population are Catholics, 9.7% are Protestants. (1992)

50% of the population is of European descent

40% of the population is Mestizo.

10% of the population is native to Bolivia

References

External links 
General map of province
Detailed map of province towns and rivers
Population data (Spanish)
Social data (Spanish)

Provinces of Santa Cruz Department (Bolivia)